The youth in Asia constituted the largest youth population by region in 2015, numbering 718 million. The United Nations defines youth as persons aged 15 to 24 years. The number of youth in Asia is projected to decline to 619 million by 2060.

See also 

 Aging in Japan
 Japanese youth culture
 Suicide ideation in South Korean LGBT youth
 Youth unemployment in South Korea

References